Østby is a village in the municipality of Tydal in Trøndelag county, Norway.

References

Villages in Trøndelag
Tydal